Nanthana Komwong (born 13 September 1980) is a Thai table tennis player.

At the 2000 Olympics, she did not win through beyond the group stage. She reached the third round in 2004, losing to Viktoria Pavlovich. She competed at the 2008 Summer Olympics, reaching the second round of the singles competition. She also reached the second round at the 2012 Summer Olympics, losing to Iveta Vacenovska.

She was born in Lampang, and resides in Bangkok.

References

2008 Olympic profile

1980 births
Living people
Nanthana Komwong
Nanthana Komwong
Table tennis players at the 2000 Summer Olympics
Table tennis players at the 2004 Summer Olympics
Table tennis players at the 2008 Summer Olympics
Table tennis players at the 2012 Summer Olympics
Table tennis players at the 2016 Summer Olympics
Nanthana Komwong
Table tennis players at the 2006 Asian Games
Table tennis players at the 2010 Asian Games
Table tennis players at the 2014 Asian Games
Universiade medalists in table tennis
Southeast Asian Games medalists in table tennis
Nanthana Komwong
Nanthana Komwong
Table tennis players at the 2018 Asian Games
Competitors at the 2001 Southeast Asian Games
Competitors at the 2005 Southeast Asian Games
Competitors at the 2007 Southeast Asian Games
Competitors at the 2009 Southeast Asian Games
Competitors at the 2011 Southeast Asian Games
Competitors at the 2013 Southeast Asian Games
Competitors at the 2015 Southeast Asian Games
Competitors at the 2017 Southeast Asian Games
Universiade bronze medalists for Thailand
Nanthana Komwong
Competitors at the 2019 Southeast Asian Games
Medalists at the 2007 Summer Universiade
Nanthana Komwong
Nanthana Komwong